The 2013 season was Kashima Antlers 10th season in the J1 League. They got to the 4th round of the Emperors Cup and the 1st round of the J.League Cup, and ended up finishing 5th in the league.

Final League Table

Squad

Results

J1 League

Emperors Cup

J.League Cup

Statistics

Overview

Goalscorers

League position by matchday

Appearances and goals

|-
! colspan=12 style=background:#dcdcdc; text-align:center| Goalkeepers

|-
! colspan=12 style=background:#dcdcdc; text-align:center| Defenders

|-
! colspan=12 style=background:#dcdcdc; text-align:center| Midfielders

|-
! colspan=12 style=background:#dcdcdc; text-align:center| Forwards

|}

Transfers

In

Out

References

Kashima Antlers
Kashima Antlers seasons